The 14th Parliament of Lower Canada was in session from January 21, 1831, to October 9, 1834. Elections to the Legislative Assembly in Lower Canada had been held in October 1830. The Ninety-Two Resolutions were submitted to the legislative assembly in 1834. All sessions were held at Quebec City.

References

External links 
  Assemblée nationale du Québec (French)
Journals of the House of Assembly of Lower Canada ..., John Neilson (1831)

Parliaments of Lower Canada
1831 establishments in Lower Canada
1834 disestablishments in Lower Canada